Kawasaki Caribbean Challenge is a Super NES racing game that was released in 1993 exclusively for the North American market.

Gameplay
Either one or two players can race six different Kawasaki vehicles across three different Caribbean islands. Players must finish five laps and finish in first place in order to be credited with a win.

There are a lot of treacherous curves and bends on the race track as the player(s) race for top supremacy and for a finish in the top spot.

See also
Kawasaki Superbike Challenge

References

1993 video games
Kawasaki Heavy Industries
North America-exclusive video games
Racing video games
Super Nintendo Entertainment System games
Super Nintendo Entertainment System-only games
Multiplayer and single-player video games
Video games developed in the United States
GameTek games